The London Legacy Development Corporation (LLDC) is an organisation established in 2012, replacing the Olympic Park Legacy Company and the planning powers of the Olympic Delivery Authority. It was formed as a mayoral development corporation under the powers of the Localism Act 2011. The mayoral development area covered by the development corporation is the Olympic Park and surrounding areas.

Costs associated with London Stadium
In November 2016, London Mayor Sadiq Khan ordered an investigation into the rising costs for the London Stadium, which the LLDC partly owns.

Leadership Roles
On 2 November 2016, David Edmonds resigned as Chair of LLDC having served in that position since September 2015. Sir Peter Hendy was appointed as Chair in July 2017.

In August 2017, David Goldstone resigned from his role as Chief Executive of LLDC having served for three years. 
Lyn Garner was appointed as the new Chief Executive in December 2017.

Board members
The members of the board are:
Lord Hendy of Richmond Hill, Chair
Sonita Alleyne OBE
Nicky Dunn OBE
Keith Edelman 
Clare Coghill, Leader of the London Borough of Waltham Forest
Pam Alexander OBE
Baroness Grey-Thompson
Geoff Thompson MBE
Sukhvinder Kaur-Stubbs
Shanika Amarasekara
Simon Blanchflower
Rachel Blake
Rokhsana Fiaz OBE, Mayor of Newham
Philip Glanville, Mayor of Hackney
Jules Pipe CBE

References

External links
London Legacy Development Corporation
London Legacy Planning Authority
The London Legacy Development Corporation (Establishment) Order 2012
The London Legacy Development Corporation (Planning Functions) Order 2012
The London Legacy Development Corporation (Tax Consequences) Regulations 2012
The Value Added Tax (Refund of Tax to the London Legacy Development Corporation) Order 2015

Greater London Authority functional bodies
Development Corporations of the United Kingdom
2012 Summer Olympics
2012 Summer Paralympics
Redevelopment projects in London